Paonia State Park is a Colorado State Park located in Gunnison County east of Paonia,  Colorado.  The  park in a canyon surrounding Paonia Reservoir on the North Fork Gunnison River was established in 1964. Park facilities include campsites, picnic sites and a boat ramp. Geologic formations from the Cretaceous and Paleocene periods are visible in the park, along with fossilized palm fronds and leaf imprints.  Park uplands are gambel oak shrublands along with mixed conifer and aspen forests. Commonly seen wildlife include mule deer, elk, cottontail rabbit and marmot.

References

State parks of Colorado
Protected areas of Gunnison County, Colorado
Protected areas established in 1964